The 1992 African Cup of Nations was the 18th edition of the Africa Cup of Nations, the football championship of Africa (CAF). It was hosted by Senegal. The field expanded to twelve teams, split into four groups of three; the top two teams in each group advanced to the quarterfinals. Ivory Coast won its first championship, beating Ghana on penalty kicks 11–10 after a goalless draw.

Qualified teams 

The 12 qualified teams are:

  (holders)
 
 
 
 
 
 
 
 
  (hosts)

Venues 
The competition was played in two venues in Dakar and Ziguinchor.

Squads

First round

Group A

Group B

Group C

Group D

Knockout stage

Quarter-finals

Semi-finals

Third place match

Final 

The penalty shootout was significant in that it was the first in the final of a major international tournament that every player on the pitch took a penalty.

Scorers 
4 goals
  Rashidi Yekini

3 goals
  Abedi Pele

2 goals

  Pierre Tchibota
  Anthony Yeboah
  Jules Bocandé

1 goal

  Nacer Bouiche
  Érnest Ebongué
  André Kana-Biyik
  François Omam-Biyik
  Emmanuel Maboang
  Prince Polley
  Youssouf Fofana
  Donald Olivier Sié
  Joël Tiehi
  Abdoulaye Traoré
  Micky Weche
  Said Rokbi
  Mutiu Adepoju
  Friday Ekpo
  Stephen Keshi
  Samson Siasia
  Victor Diagne
  Souleymane Sané
  Andre Kona N'Gole
  Tueba Menayane
  Kalusha Bwalya

CAF Team of the Tournament 
Goalkeeper
  Alain Gouaméné

Defenders
  Basile Aka Kouame
  Hany Ramzy
  Stephen Keshi
  Adolphe Mendy

Midfielders
  Jacques Kinkomba Kingambo
  Abedi Pele
  Jean-Claude Pagal
  Serge-Alain Maguy

Forwards
  Rashidi Yekini
  Anthony Yeboah

References

External links 

 Details at RSSSF

 
International association football competitions hosted by Senegal
Africa Cup of Nations tournaments
A
Cup of Nations
African Cup of Nations